Plats bruts (literally "Dirty Dishes") was a sitcom broadcast by TV3. The show follows the life of Josep Lopes and David Güell. The show was co-produced by Kràmpack, El Terrat and Televisió de Catalunya and directed by Oriol Grau, Lluís Manyoses and Joel Joan. The series, which ran for 73 episodes of between 25 and 30 minutes over six seasons, was broadcast between April 19, 1999 and April 15, 2002.

Plats Bruts enjoyed very good ratings from the beginning, reaching up to a million viewers in the second episode broadcast, and achieved an average of over 35% share and 900,000 viewers in Catalonia. Afterwards the series was broadcast on Canal 300 and 3XL and dubbed into Spanish so it could be aired on Vía Digital, a digital platform which a predecessor of Movistar Plus and ETB 2, a channel broadcasting in the Basque Country.

The series generally contained self-contained stories, with no  continuous plot. During its emission it received very good reviews thanks to its fresh and amusing script and due to the cast of actors, several of whom went on to enjoy fame at a national level, including Jordi Sánchez. The show regularly makes fun of Catalan society, especially in its references to Catalanism.

Synopsis
Lópes and David are two men who share a flat in the Eixample district of Barcelona. The relationship between the two exists because Lopes was David's Boy Scout leader when he was young but, in terms of their personality, they are not at all alike. In the first episode, when they both visit an apartment which is up for rent, they decide to share.

Lopes is a failure: a 34-year-old bachelor who has to share a flat because he has on a "junk contract" at Ràdio Bofarull, where he works as an announcer. David is a somewhat spoiled young man who one day decides to break with his life and move out of his parents' house, although he still receives a weekly allowance and takes his house assistant, Carbonell, with him. He is convinced that he has the talent to be an actor and studies at the Institut del Teatre in Barcelona.

The two men are accompanied by Emma, a girl who lives in a wooden shack located on the roof of the building but uses the men's flat's water, light and heating.

Other recurring characters include Pol, a gay man acting student and classmate of David who works as a waiter in the Café Maurici; Ramon, Lopes's colleague on the radio; and Mercedes, the director of Ràdio Bofarull.

Episodes

Like many sitcoms, the show's episode titles followed a naming convention: all but four started with the word "tinc" meaning "I have", and the exceptions to the rule varied only slightly, beginning with words like "Tenim" (we have), "No tinc" (I don't have) or "Ho tinc" ("I have it").

The show's greatest controversy was an episode titled "Tinc una revelació" ("I have a revelation"), which was censured for some time. In the episode, David develops a Messiah complex after watching The Passion of the Christ, before finally giving way to temptation in the form of Lopes' visiting female friend. It was not broadcast during the show's reruns or via online platforms. Finally in 2018, after receiving questions from Catalan newspaper Ara, TV3 made the episode available to watch online.

The show's final episode was "Tinc Touchdown" ("I have a touchdown") and featured the Barcelona Dragons American football team.

External links
 Official website
 Information about Plats Bruts
 Plats Bruts IMDb

Televisió de Catalunya
Catalan television programmes
Television shows set in Barcelona
1990s Spanish comedy television series
2000s Spanish comedy television series